Shane Gill is an Australian judge. He has been a judge of the Family Court of Australia since 16 May 2016.

See also
Australian legal system

References

Judges of the Family Court of Australia
Year of birth missing (living people)
Living people
Place of birth missing (living people)